Louise Ford is a British comedian and actress. She has appeared in comedy television including children's sketch series Horrible Histories (2015–2018) and performed a leading role in Crashing (2016). She portrayed a fictionalised version of the Duchess of Cambridge in The Windsors (2016–2020). She has performed at the Edinburgh Festival Fringe with Yasmine Akram and with Cariad Lloyd.

Education and personal life 
Ford graduated from the Royal Academy of Dramatic Art in 2007. After working with actor Rowan Atkinson on the play Quartermaine's Terms in 2013, the pair began an affair, leading to Atkinson separating from his wife in 2014 and finalising divorce in 2015. Ford and Atkinson have one daughter born in 2017. Ford was previously in a relationship with comedian James Acaster between 2011 and 2013.

References

External links

Living people
21st-century British actresses
Year of birth missing (living people)
Alumni of RADA
British comedians